John Taylor or Johnny Taylor (b. Freetown, Sierra Leone, d. March 12, 1898) was a Creole merchant based in Port Loko who was killed during the Hut Tax War by Bai Bureh's war boys. Taylor was the only Creole who was murdered by Bai Bureh's war boys and his death was said to have been caused by his actions during the uprising.

Hut Tax War and death
John Taylor moved from Freetown and established a store in Port Loko, Sierra Leone. Taylor was killed by Temne "war boys" mustered by Bai Bureh during the Hut Tax War in 1898. The war boys found Taylor by releasing his pet monkey, which ran upstairs and revealed where he was hiding in his house. Taylor's throat was then cut and he was "chopped" to pieces by the war boys. Taylor was killed because Bai Bureh's men believed he supported the British in their "hut tax" on all houses. Taylor was also accused of spying and providing information to District Commissioner Sharpe regarding the movement of Bai Bureh's men.

Family
Taylor had a daughter called Susan Taylor who resided at Cline Town after her marriage. Taylor was married to Tabitha Mariah Taylor (the daughter of the catechist Charles S. Brown) and the couple had a daughter called Mary Petan Taylor. Mary Taylor was five years old when her father was killed in Port Loko.

Year of birth missing
Sierra Leone Creole people
Hut Tax War of 1898
1898 deaths
People from Freetown
Sierra Leonean businesspeople
Sierra Leonean murder victims
Sierra Leonean people of British descent
People murdered in Sierra Leone